is a Japanese professional sumo wrestler from Kashima, Kumamoto. He made his professional debut in January 1996 and reached the top division in September 2011. His highest rank has been maegashira 12. The fifteen years it took him to reach the top division is the third-slowest progress ever, in the history of professional sumo wrestling.

Early life and sumo background
In his early years Ishihara was more interested in soccer, and was a member of the kendō team in middle school. He started sumo in high school, and in his third year contributed to his team taking the championship in a national tournament. He chose to join Tamanoi stable when he graduated high school.

Career
Upon joining professional sumo in March 1996, he took the ring name of Yoshiazuma, taking the first character from a benefactor's name and the second character following the convention of taking the character of azuma from the current and previous stable owners, former Tochiazuma II, and Tochiazuma I. Yoshiazuma's career started out very successfully and in only his second tournament he almost took the jonidan division championship, losing a three-man playoff to Akiyama.  He actually beat Akiyama in the second round, but lost to him in the fourth and final round. His career after this was lackluster however, and for the next fifteen years he would struggle in the unsalaried ranks, through a series of setbacks, ever so slowly working his way up through the ranks.

He finally achieved promotion to the salaried ranks of jūryō in January 2011. He scored only 6–9 in his jūryō debut, but after the cancellation of the March tournament he enjoyed a big promotion up the division from jūryō 13 to jūryō 2 despite only scoring a bare majority of 8–7 in the May 2011 "technical examination" tournament. He benefitted from a large number of retirements in the jūryō division following a match-fixing scandal, with the Sumo Association needing to over-promote to fill the gaps. However he took advantage of his good fortune by putting in a strong 9–6 score in July and was promoted to the top division for the September 2011 tournament.  This feat took him fifteen years and 93 tournaments from his professional debut, the third slowest rise to the top division in the history of sumo. He was also the second oldest wrestler since World War II to earn promotion to makuuchi for the first time at 34 years, 3 months. However, he only lasted this one tournament, being relegated after a 5–10 record. His second tournament in makuuchi was also unsuccessful, a 3–12 in January 2012. After three winning records in the next four tournaments he earned promotion to makuuchi for a third time in November 2012, but was again demoted straightaway, after another 3–12 score. Yoshiazuma lost sekitori status altogether after the September 2014 tournament. He earned his 500th career win in the March 2016 tournament, and he has a career winning record of just under 50 percent, having fought 1008 matches up to that time. He was demoted to the sandanme division after this tournament, but was still active as of March 2022 at the age of 44, and he is the oldest active former sekitori.

He has not missed a bout through injury since his debut. July 2018 was his 135th career tournament with no absences over a period of 22 years, equal to Aobajo, although Yoshiazuma has fought around 500 bouts fewer than Aobajo's record of 1630 consecutive bouts, having spent only 21 of those tournaments in the sekitori ranks fighting a full 15 days. In September 2020 nineteen members of Tamanoi stable tested positive for COVID-19, after a lower ranked wrestler became ill. Every wrestler at the stable, including Yoshiazuma was prevented from participating in the September tournament.

Fighting style
Yoshiazuma is a solidly yotsu-sumo wrestler who prefers grappling to pushing and thrusting techniques. His favoured grip on his opponent's mawashi or belt is migi-yotsu, a left hand outside, right hand inside position. He wins about half of his bouts with a straightforward yori-kiri, or force out. Another kimarite he regularly uses is hataki-komi, the slap down.

Career record

See also
List of sumo record holders
Glossary of sumo terms
List of active sumo wrestlers

References

External links

1977 births
Living people
Japanese sumo wrestlers
Sumo people from Kumamoto Prefecture